Birria language may refer to:
Biri language/Birigaba (Maric)
Pirriya language/Bidia (Karnic)

Both are Australian languages.